The 2020 RS:X World Championships was held from 23 to 29 February 2020 in Sorrento, Victoria, Australia.

Medal summary

Medal table

References

Windsurfing World Championships
World Championships
2020 in Australian sport
International sports competitions hosted by Australia
RS:X World Championships